Jesse Mockrin (born 1981, Silver Spring, Maryland) is an American artist who lives and works in Los Angeles. Her work primarily consists of figurative paintings.

Education 
In 2003, Mockrin received her Bachelor's of Arts at Barnard College. She continued her education, and in 2011 received her MFA at the University of California in San Diego.

Career 
Mockrin is represented by Night Gallery in Los Angeles, where she had solo exhibitions in 2014 and 2016. Her 2016 show, titled “The Progress of Love,” included paintings inspired by Rococo and men's fashion; the resulting works demonstrated the artist's interest in “the fluidity of gender.” In November 2016, she presented a solo exhibition at Nathalie Karg Gallery in New York, titled “The Pleasures of Dance.” In March 2017, she presented a solo show titled “XOXO” at Galerie Perrotin, Seoul, in collaboration with Night Gallery, which consisted of a new series of tondo paintings depicting the K-Pop group EXO. Her work has been written about in The New Yorker, T Magazine, Modern Painters, Art Agenda, and The Paris Review, among other publications.

Awards 
Some of her awards are as follows: In 2002, she received the Joyce Krosh Kaiser Fine Arts Grant; in 2008, the Russell Foundation Grant; and in 2009, the Alumnae Association of Barnard College Fellowship for Graduate Study.

References

External links 

20th-century American painters
Living people
1981 births
21st-century American painters
Barnard College alumni
University of California, San Diego alumni
Artists from Maryland
People from Silver Spring, Maryland